The term high church refers to beliefs and practices of Christian ecclesiology, liturgy, and theology that emphasize "ritual, priestly authority,  [and] sacraments". Although used in connection with various Christian traditions, the term originated in and has been principally associated with the Anglican tradition, where it describes churches using a number of ritual practices associated in the popular mind with Roman Catholicism and Eastern Orthodoxy. The opposite tradition is low church. Contemporary media discussing Anglican churches erroneously prefer the terms evangelical to low church and Anglo-Catholic to high church, even though their meanings do not exactly correspond. Other contemporary denominations that contain high church wings include some Lutheran, Presbyterian, and Methodist churches.

Variations
Because of its history, the term high church also refers to aspects of Anglicanism quite distinct from the Oxford Movement or Anglo-Catholicism. There remain parishes that are high church and yet adhere closely to the quintessentially Anglican usages and liturgical practices of the Book of Common Prayer.

High church Anglicanism tends to be closer than low church to Roman Catholic and Eastern Orthodox teachings and spirituality; its hallmarks are relatively elaborate music, altarpieces, clergy vestments and an emphasis on sacraments. It is intrinsically traditional.

High church nonetheless includes many bishops, other clergy and adherents sympathetic to mainstream modern consensus across reformed Christianity that, according to official Roman Catholic and Eastern Orthodox Christian teachings, are anathema (see the ordination of women and to varying degrees abortion).

The term high church has also been applied to elements of Protestant churches within which individual congregations or ministers display a division in their liturgical practices, for example, high church Presbyterianism, high church Methodism and within Lutheranism there is a historic high church and low church distinction comparable with Anglicanism (see Neo-Lutheranism and Pietism).

Evolution of the term
In the 17th century, high church was used to describe those clergy and laity who placed a high emphasis on complete adherence to the Established Church position, including some emphasis on ritual or liturgical practices inherited from the Early Church or the Undivided Church. However, as the Puritans began demanding that the English Church abandon some of its traditional liturgical emphases, episcopal structures, parish ornaments and the like, the high church position came to be distinguished increasingly from that of the Latitudinarians, also known as those promoting a broad church, who sought to minimise the differences between Anglicanism and Reformed Christianity, and to make the church as inclusive as possible by opening its doors as widely as possible to admit other Christian viewpoints.

Over time several of the leading lights of the Oxford Movement became Roman Catholics, following the path of John Henry Newman, one of the fathers of the Oxford Movement and, for a time, a high churchman himself. A lifelong High Churchman, the Reverend Edward Bouverie Pusey remained the spiritual father of the Oxford Movement who remained a priest in the Church of England. To a lesser extent, looking back from the 19th century, the term high church also came to be associated with the beliefs of the Caroline divines and with the pietistic emphases of the period, practised by the Little Gidding community, such as fasting and lengthy preparations before receiving the Eucharist.

Before 1833
During the reign of King James I, there were attempts to diminish the growth of party feeling within the Church of England, and indeed to reconcile to the Church moderate Puritans who did not already conform to the Established Church or who had left the Church in recent years. The project to create the Authorized Version of the Bible was one such attempt at reconciliation. The continued use of the King James version of the Bible, by Anglicans and other Protestants alike in the English-speaking world, is a reflection of the success of this endeavour at cooperation.

During the reign of King Charles I, however, as divisions between Puritan and Catholic elements within the Church of England became more bitter, and Protestant Nonconformity outside the Church grew stronger in numbers and more vociferous, the High Church position became associated with the leadership of the High Church Archbishop of Canterbury, William Laud, (see Laudianism), and government policy to curtail the growth of Protestant Dissent in England and the other possessions of the Crown. See, for example, the attempt to reimpose episcopacy on the Church of Scotland, a policy that was 'successful' until the reign of William and Mary, when the office of bishop was discontinued except among the small minority of Scots who belonged to the Scottish Episcopal Church.

In the wake of the disestablishment of Anglicanism and the persecution of Anglican beliefs and practices under the Commonwealth, the return of the Anglican party to power in the Cavalier Parliament saw a strong revival of the High Church position in the English body politic. Victorious after a generation of struggle, the Anglican gentry felt the need to re-entrench the re-Anglicanised Church of England as one of the most important elements of the Restoration Settlement through a renewed and strengthened alliance between Throne and Altar, or Church and State. Reverence for martyrdom of the Stuart king Charles I as an upholder of his Coronation Oath to protect the Church of England became a hallmark of High Church orthodoxy. At the same time, the Stuart dynasty was expected to maintain its adherence to Anglicanism. This became an important issue for the High Church party and it was to disturb the Restoration Settlement under Charles II's brother, King James II, a convert to Roman Catholicism, and lead to setbacks for the High Church party. These events culminated in the Glorious Revolution and the exclusion of the Catholic Stuarts from the British throne. The subsequent split over office-holders' oaths of allegiance to the Crown and the Royal Succession, which led to the exclusion of the Non-Juror bishops who refused to recognise the 1688 de facto abdication of the King, and the accession of King William III and Queen Mary II, and did much to damage the unity of High Church party.

Later events surrounding the attempts of the Jacobites, the adherents of the excluded dynasts, to regain the English and Scottish thrones, led to a sharpening of anti-Catholic rhetoric in Britain and a distancing of the High Church party from the more ritualistic aspects of Caroline High churchmanship, which were often associated with the schismatic Non-Jurors. Eventually, under Queen Anne, the High Church party saw its fortunes revive with those of the Tory party, with which it was then strongly associated.

However, under the early Hanoverians, both the High Church and Tory parties were once again out of favour. This led to an increasing marginalisation of High Church and Tory viewpoints, as much of the 18th century was given over to the rule of the Whig party and the aristocratic families who were in large measure pragmatic latitudinarians in churchmanship. This was also the Age of Reason, which marked a period of great spiritual somnolence and stultification in the Church of England.

Thus, by the end of the 18th century and the beginning of the 19th, those liturgical practices prevalent even in High Church circles were not of the same tenor as those later found under the Catholic revival of the 19th century.  High Church clergy and laity were often termed high and dry, in reference to their traditional high attitude with regard to political position of the Church in England, and dry faith, which was accompanied by an austere but decorous mode of worship, as reflective of their idea of an orderly and dignified churchmanship against the rantings of the low churchmen that their Cavalier ancestors had defeated. Over time, their High Church position had become ossified among a remnant of bookish churchmen and country squires. An example of an early 19th-century churchman of this tradition is Sir Robert Inglis MP.

From 1833
Only with the success of the Oxford Movement and its increasing emphases on ritualistic revival from the mid-19th century onward, did the term High Church begin to mean something approaching the later term Anglo-Catholic. Even then, it was only employed coterminously in contrast to the Low churchmanship of the Evangelical and Pietist position.  This sought, once again, to lessen the separation of Anglicans (the Established Church) from the majority of Protestant Nonconformists, who by this time included the Wesleyans and other Methodists as well as adherents of older Protestant denominations known by the group term Old Dissent. In contrast to earlier alliances with the Tories, Anglo-Catholicism became increasingly associated with socialism, the Labour Party and greater decision-making liberty for the church's convocations.

From the mid-19th century onward, the term High Church generally became associated with a more avowedly Anglo-Catholic liturgical or even triumphalist position within the English Church, while the remaining Latitudinarians were referred to as being Broad Church and the re-emergent evangelical party was dubbed Low Church. However, high church can still refer to Anglicans who hold a high view of the sacraments, church tradition and the threefold ministry but do not specifically consider themselves Anglo-Catholics.

Anglican Communion

Notable parishes

Notable institutions 
Keble College, Oxford
Pusey House, Oxford
St Stephen's House, Oxford
Nashotah House

See also 
Anglican devotions
Anglo-Catholicism
Broad church
Central churchmanship
Evangelical Catholic
Church of England
Church of South India
Churchmanship
Continuing Anglican Movement
Anglican Catholic Church
Anglican Catholic Church of Canada
Anglican Church in America
Anglican Province of America
United Episcopal Church of North America
Christian monasticism
Affirming Catholicism
Society of Catholic Priests
High Church Lutheranism
High Mass
Neo-Lutheranism
Ritualism
Scottish Church Society
Crypto-papism

Bibliography 
Addleshaw, G. W. O. (1941) The High Church Tradition: a study in the liturgical thought of the seventeenth century. London: Faber
Cross, F. L. (ed.) (1957) The Oxford Dictionary of the Christian Church. London: Oxford U. P.; High Churchmen, p. 636
Hein, David (1991) "The High Church Origins of the American Boarding School" in: Journal of Ecclesiastical History 42 (1991): 577–95.
Hylson-Smith, Kenneth (1993) High Churchmanship in the Church of England, from the sixteenth century to the late twentieth century. Edinburgh: T & T Clark

References

External links
High Church vs. Low Church: Documentary Narrative of an Ecclesiastical Joke compiled by Richard Mammana and Cynthia McFarland for Anglicans Online

Anglican Churchmanship
Anglo-Catholicism
Christian terminology